Rosneath (Ros Neimhidh in Gaelic) is a village in Argyll and Bute, Scotland.

The Gare Loch narrows at Rosneath to under half a mile (around 600 metres) at a place known as the Rhu Narrows, after the village of Rhu on the eastern shore of the loch.

Rosneath Bay to the south of the village curves eastward to Castle Point, near the site of the former Roseneath Castle, in the grounds of the former Rosneath House which are now occupied by Rosneath caravan park. The coast turns south past Culwatty Bay to Rosneath Point at the tip of the peninsula, which is directly north of Princes Pier in the large town of Greenock,  distant on the southern shore of the Firth.

History 
The Rosneath area has been settled from at least 600 onwards, when St. Modan, a travelling missionary, founded a church there. The name Rosneath may have its roots in this era; it might be derived from the Gaelic Rossnachoich, meaning "Virgin's Headland". Another account indicates that it may come from Ross-neoth, or "unwooded headland". The name has historically been spelled as Roseneath (notably in both the First and New (or Second) Statistical Accounts of Scotland). A more visible example is Roseneath Street in Greenock, which looks over the River Clyde to Rosneath Point, and dates from around 1870.

Later, the area was heavily fortified, with Rosneath's own castling joining those of nearby Faslane and Shandon (located at Faslane and Shandon), all of which are long since gone. Rosneath village did not yet fully exist by this time; instead, Rosneath parish was home to many free-standing dwellings, the occupants of which were, for the vast bulk of the area's history, employed in agriculture and fishing. Frequent shipping services to Glasgow, Greenock and beyond were vital for the local economy.

Rosneath Castle was ruined and rebuilt many times; the final rebuilding, as Rosneath House, came in 1803–06, three years after the previous building burned down. Located further uphill from previous versions, it belonged to the Duke of Argyll, whose family retained it until Princess Louise died in 1939. In stark contrast to the earlier castles, it was in the Romanesque Revival style.

From 1941 to 1945, Rosneath was home to an important naval base known as Rosneath naval base, thanks to its location in the well-sheltered natural harbour of the Gare Loch. The Americans used Rosneath Castle as a base of operations. The castle was then abandoned and the remains demolished in 1961.

The Rosneath Peninsula was formerly in the traditional County of Dunbarton until local government reorganisation moved it into the Argyll and Bute council area in 1996.

Population
At the 2001 census, its population was 931. It is situated on the B833, a shoreside minor thoroughfare that serves the peninsula.

Notable people
John Anderson, the 18th century scientist, educational pioneer and radical who founded what became the University of Strathclyde, was born in Rosneath where his father served as minister of the parish church.
The founder of the first Rangers F.C. team, Moses McNeil, lived at Clynder, just outside Rosneath. He was buried at the Old Churchyard of Rosneath in 1938. His death went unnoticed at the time by the media and he had nothing to leave in his will. Moses final resting place has been marked with a plaque by Rangers and members of the local community.
Princess Louise, Duchess of Argyll, the daughter of Queen Victoria, was the last resident of Rosneath House.
William de Bois Maclaren, publisher, businessman and Scout Commissioner, purchased Gilwell Park in Essex and donated it to The Scout Association in 1919.

References

External links

Villages in Argyll and Bute